Różycki may refer to:

Jerzy Różycki (1909–1942), Polish mathematician and cryptologist who worked at breaking German Enigma-machine ciphers
Ludomir Różycki (1884–1953), Polish composer and conductor
Łukasz Różycki, Polish pair skater
Samuel Różycki (1781–1834), officer in the Duchy of Warsaw and Polish Legions of the Napoleonic period
Zenon Różycki (1913–1992), Polish basketball player
Max Kepler-Rozycki (born 1993), German baseball player